Randle Nettles (born October 1836) was a farmer, Baptist preacher, state legislator, and state militia member during the Reconstruction era in Mississippi. He served on the county Board of Supervisors from 1870 to 1872. He represented Oktibbeha County in the Mississippi House of Representatives from 1870 to 1873. He was appointed as an officer to the state militia.

See also
African-American officeholders during and following the Reconstruction era

References

Year of death missing
1836 births
Members of the Mississippi House of Representatives